F430 is the cofactor (sometimes called the coenzyme) of the enzyme methyl coenzyme M reductase (MCR).
MCR catalyzes the reaction  that releases methane in the final step of methanogenesis:
 + HS–CoB  →    +  CoB–S–S–CoM

It is found only in methanogenic Archaea and anaerobic methanotrophic Archaea.  It occurs in relatively high concentrations in archaea that are involved in reverse methanogenesis: these can contain up to 7% by weight of the nickel protein.

Structure
The trivial name cofactor F430 was assigned in 1978 based on the properties of a yellow sample extracted from Methanobacterium thermoautotrophicum, which had  a spectroscopic maximum at 430 nm. It was identified as the MCR cofactor in 1982 and the complete structure was deduced by X-ray crystallography and NMR spectroscopy. Coenzyme F430 features a reduced porphyrin in a macrocyclic ring system called a corphin. In addition, it possesses two additional rings in comparison to the standard tetrapyrrole (rings A-D), having a γ-lactam ring E and a keto-containing carbocyclic ring F. It is the only natural tetrapyrrole containing nickel, an element rarely found in biological systems.

Biosynthesis

The biosynthesis builds from uroporphyrinogen III, the progenitor of all natural tetrapyrroles, including chlorophyll, vitamin B12, phycobilins, siroheme, heme, and heme d1. It is converted to sirohydrochlorin via dihydrosirohydrochlorin. Insertion of nickel into this tetrapyrrole is catalysed in reaction  by the same chelatase, CbiX, which inserts cobalt in the biosynthesis of cobalamin, here giving nickel(II)-sirohydrochlorin. 

The ATP-dependent Ni-sirohydrochlorin a,c-diamide synthase (CfbE) then converts the a and c acetate side chains to acetamide in reactions , generating nickel(II)-sirohydrochlorin a,c-diamide. The sequence of the two amidations is random. A two-component complex Ni-sirohydrochlorin a,c-diamide reductive cyclase (CfbCD) carries out a 6-electron and 7-proton reduction of the ring system in a reaction  generating the 15,173-seco-F430-173-acid (seco-F430) intermediate. Reduction involves ATP hydrolysis and electrons are relayed through two 4Fe-4S centres. In the final step, the keto-containing carbocylic ring F is formed by an ATP-dependent enzyme Coenzyme F(430) synthetase (CfbB) in reaction , generating coenzyme F430.  This enzyme is a MurF-like ligase, as found in peptidoglycan biosynthesis.

References

Tetrapyrroles
Cofactors
Nickel compounds